WPZM-LP (107.5 FM) is a radio station broadcasting a religious radio format. Licensed to Gainesville, Florida, United States, the station is currently owned by the Community Praise Center.

References

External links
 

PZM-LP
PZM-LP
Gospel radio stations in the United States
Gainesville, Florida